Events in the year 1336 in Japan.

Incumbents
Monarch: Kōmyō

Events
January 24 - Ashikaga Takauji defeats Nitta Yoshisada at Hakone, establishing the Ashikaga shogunate. (Traditional Japanese Date: Eleventh Day of the Twelfth Month, 1335)

References

 
 
Japan
Years of the 14th century in Japan
Mentioned in episode Bad Wolf of Doctor Who